You Could Be Happy may refer to:

You Could Be Happy, EP by Sahara Beck
"You Could Be Happy", single by Paul Oakenfold featuring Angela McCluskey
"You Could Be Happy", song by Snow Patrol Eyes Open